Rostrot is a 2011 album from the German death metal / black metal band Eisregen.

Track listing 

 Erlösung – 2:25
 Schakal-Ode an die Streubombe – 3:56
 Madenreich – 3:48
 Ich sah den Teufel – 7:25
 Blutvater – 3:20
 Bewegliche Ziele – 5:36
 Kathi das Kuchenschwein – 5:47
 Wechselbalg – 4:32
 Fahles Ross – 5:40
 Rostrot – 6:45
 Ich, Zombie [Bonus track] – 4:51
 Madenreich (Live in Mogadischu/Somalia 2013) [Bonus track] – 3:49

Personnel
 Vocals: Michael "Blutkehle" Roth
 Drums: Ronny "Yantit" Fimmel
 E-guitar: Michael "Bursche" Lenz
 Keyboard: Franzi "Dr. Franzenstein" Brink

2011 albums
Eisregen albums
Massacre Records albums